D'Urville Monument is a conspicuous conical summit,  high, at the south-west end of Joinville Island, off the north-east end of the Antarctic Peninsula. It was discovered by a British expedition under James Clark Ross between 1839–43. It was named by him for Captain Jules Dumont d'Urville.

Important Bird Area
The site has been identified as an Important Bird Area (IBA) by BirdLife International because it supports a large breeding colony of about 10,000 pairs of Adélie penguins and over 670 pairs of gentoo penguins.

References

 

Mountains of Graham Land
Landforms of the Joinville Island group
Important Bird Areas of Antarctica
Penguin colonies